Nawab Muhammad Yousuf Talpur (born 15 January 1943) is a Pakistani politician who has been a member of the National Assembly of Pakistan, since August 2018. Previously he was a member of the National Assembly from 2002 to May 2018.

Early life
He was born on 15 January 1943.
Children = Nawab Younis Talpur , Nawab Taimoor Talpur

Political career

He was elected to the National Assembly of Pakistan as a candidate of Pakistan Peoples Party (PPP) from Constituency NA-228 (Mirpurkhas-III) in 2002 Pakistani general election. He received 58,161 votes and defeated Kishan Chand Parwani.

He was re-elected to the National Assembly as a candidate of PPP from Constituency NA-228 (Umerkot) in 2008 Pakistani general election. He received 75,080 votes and defeated an independent candidate, Mohammad Qasim Soomro.

He was re-elected to the National Assembly as a candidate of PPP from Constituency NA-228 (Umerkot) in 2013 Pakistani general election. He received 99,700 votes and defeated Shah Mehmood Qureshi.

He was re-elected to the National Assembly as a candidate of PPP from Constituency NA-220 (Umerkot) in 2018 Pakistani general election.

References

Living people
Pakistan People's Party politicians
Sindhi people
Pakistani MNAs 2013–2018
People from Sindh
1943 births
Pakistani MNAs 2008–2013
Pakistani MNAs 2002–2007
Pakistani MNAs 2018–2023